The United States Air Force's  1st Space Surveillance Squadron (1 SSS) was a space surveillance unit located at Griffiss AFB, New York.

Mission
The mission of the 1 SSS was to operate the Low Altitude Space Surveillance (LASS) system to gather space intelligence and track space systems in near-Earth orbits.  The LASS operation supported USAF space intelligence requirements, while being assisted by the 18th Intelligence Squadron's Det 1 for SIGINT support. This coverage augmented worldwide coverage of space signals activities at similarly equipped sites at Misawa AB, Japan, Osan AB, Republic of Korea and at RAF Feltwell and RAF Edzell in the United Kingdom.

History
Due to the creation of mobile versions of the space surveillance systems in 1992 and the BRAC decision regarding Griffiss AFB, AFSPC inactivated the 1 SSS during 1995, distributing surveillance mission requirements to other units.  The equipment held at the Verona Test Annex, N.Y. was also distributed to units with similar capabilities.

Lineage
 Constituted as the 1st Deep Space Surveillance Squadron on 10 February 1989
 Activated on 1 April 1989
 Redesignated 1st Surveillance Squadron on 1 May 1990
 Redesignated 1st Space Surveillance Squadron on 15 May 1992
 Inaxtivated on 30 September 1995

Assignments
 73d Space Surveillance Group (later 73d Space Group), 1 April 1989
 21st Operations Group, 26 April 1995 – 30 September 1995)

Stations
 Verona Test Annex, New York, 1 April 1989 – 30 September 1995

Commanders
Jun 1993 – Jun 1995, Lt Col Stephen L. Lanning
Aug 1992 – Jun 1993, Lt Col Michael Peterson

Equipment Operated
Low Altitude Space Surveillance System (1989–1995)

See also
3d Space Experimentation Squadron
5th Space Surveillance Squadron
18th Intelligence Squadron
Griffiss Air Force Base, New York

References
 Notes

 Citations

Bibliography

External links
Peterson AFB: 21st Space Wing homepage

Military units and formations in New York (state)
Space Surveillance 0001